Jorgensen v News Media (Auckland) Ltd [1969] NZLR 961 is a New Zealand defamation case, where the plaintiff Ronald Jorgensen whom despite being convicted for murder involving one of New Zealand's most notorious killings, the Bassett Road machine gun murders, found that the defendant's newspaper referring to him to being involved in the murders was libelous.

Background
In December 1963, Fred Walker and Kevin Speight were murdered in their house on Baset Road, Remuera, Auckland. The weapon used was a .45 cal sub machine gun. In 1964, Ronald Jorgensen and John Gillies were both subsequently convicted of their murders.

The Sunday News newspaper, owned by News Media (Auckland) Limited, subsequently ran an article linking Jorgensen to the murders.

Jorgensen claimed he was not involved with the murders, and sued the newspaper for $2,000 for defamation. During the initial defamation trial, the newspaper tried to enter the defendants certificate of conviction for murder as evidence of justification. He was later convicted for the murders.

However, following Hollington v Hewthorn & Co Ltd [1943] 2 All ER 35, the fact of a criminal conviction, could not be later used as evidence in a civil trial on the basis it was an opinion only.

Jorgensen subsequently challenged the certificate of conviction being introduced as evidence in the civil trial.

Decision
The Court of Appeal of New Zealand refused to follow Hollington v Hewthorn and allowed the conviction to be used as evidence in the trial.

References

Court of Appeal of New Zealand cases
1969 in New Zealand law
1969 in case law
New Zealand tort case law